Franciszek Gajowniczek (15 November 1901 – 13 March 1995) was a Polish army sergeant whose life was saved at the Auschwitz concentration camp by Catholic priest Maximilian Kolbe, who volunteered to die in his place. 

Gajowniczek had been sent to Auschwitz concentration camp from a Gestapo prison in Tarnów. He was captured while crossing the border into Slovakia after the defeat of the Modlin Fortress during the 1939 invasion of Poland by Nazi Germany. Gajowniczek survived the war and afterward became a lay missionary, dedicating his life to spreading the story of Kolbe's sacrifice.

Biography
Franciszek Gajowniczek, a Roman Catholic, was born in Strachomin near Mińsk Mazowiecki. After the reconstitution of sovereign Poland, he moved to Warsaw in 1921, married, and had two sons. He was a professional soldier, a Polish army sergeant, who took part in the defense of Wieluń as well as Warsaw in September 1939 during the 1939 invasion of Poland by Nazi Germany. After the Battle of Modlin Gajowniczek was captured by the Gestapo in Zakopane while crossing the border into Slovakia and sentenced to forced labour in Tarnów.

Gajowniczek was transferred to Auschwitz on 8 October 1940. He and Kolbe met as inmates of Auschwitz in May 1941. When a camp prisoner appeared to have escaped, SS-Hauptsturmführer Karl Fritzsch ordered that ten other prisoners die by starvation in reprisal. Gajowniczek (prisoner number 5659) was one of those selected at roll-call. When priest Maximilian Kolbe heard Gajowniczek cry out in agony over the fate of his family, he offered himself instead, for which he was later canonized. The switch was permitted. After all his cellmates died, Kolbe (prisoner number 16670) was put to death with an injection of carbolic acid. 

Gajowniczek was transferred from Auschwitz to Sachsenhausen concentration camp on 25 October 1944. He was liberated there by the Allies, after spending five years, five months, and nine days in concentration camps in total. He reunited with his wife Helena, six months later in Rawa Mazowiecka. She survived the war, but their sons were killed in a Soviet bombardment of Rawa Mazowiecka in January 1945 before his release.

After World War II

On 17 October 1971, Gajowniczek was a special guest of Pope Paul VI in the Vatican when Maximilian Kolbe was beatified for his martyrdom. In 1972, Time magazine reported that over 150,000 people made a pilgrimage to Auschwitz to honor the anniversary of Kolbe's beatification. One of the first to speak was Gajowniczek, who declared "I want to express my thanks for the gift of life." His wife, Helena, died in 1977. Gajowniczek was in the Vatican once again, this time as a guest of Pope John Paul II, when Kolbe was canonized on 10 October 1982.

In 1994, Gajowniczek visited St. Maximilian Kolbe Catholic Church of Houston, Texas, where he told his translator Chaplain Thaddeus Horbowy that "so long as he ... has breath in his lungs, he would consider it his duty to tell people about the heroic act of love by Maximilian Kolbe." Gajowniczek died in the city of Brzeg on 13 March 1995 at the age of 93. He was buried at a convent cemetery in Niepokalanów, 53 years after having his life saved by Kolbe. He was survived by his second wife, Janina.

References

Polish military personnel of World War II
Polish soldiers
Polish Roman Catholics
1901 births
1995 deaths
Auschwitz concentration camp survivors
Sachsenhausen concentration camp survivors
People from Mińsk Mazowiecki
Polish Army personnel
Non-commissioned army personnel
Polish September Campaign participants